Schistura breviceps is a species of ray-finned fish in the stone loach genus Schistura. It has only been recorded in the drainage system of the Mae Nam Kok, a tributary of the Mekong in northern Thailand and Myanmar. It has been seen in streams with a moderate flow over gravel or stone stream beds.

References 

B
Fish described in 1945